Squaliolus is a genus of deep-sea squaliform sharks in the family Dalatiidae.

Species
 Squaliolus aliae Teng, 1959 (smalleye pygmy shark)
 Squaliolus laticaudus H. M. Smith  & Radcliffe, 1912 (spined pygmy shark)

See also

 List of prehistoric cartilaginous fish

References

 
Shark genera
Taxa named by Hugh McCormick Smith
Taxa named by Lewis Radcliffe